Nguyễn Minh Phương (born 5 July 1980) is a retired Vietnamese professional footballer who last played for SHB Đà Nẵng in the V-League. He was also the captain of the Vietnam national football team until the 2010 AFF Suzuki Cup. In 2007, he captained the Vietnamese team to the 2007 AFC Asian Cup, ending their run in the tournament in the quarter-finals.

An engine in central midfield for both club and country, Minh Phuong is known for his technical passing, kick-off taking and shows versatility by often playing as a fullback, midfielder or even as a forward. In 2010, Phuong became the most-capped Vietnamese footballer in the history of the national team with 73 caps, large beating Le Huynh Duc, who has 66 caps. After the 2010 AFF Suzuki Cup, he retired from international football after spending 8 years in the national team.

International goals

Honors 
Cảng Sài Gòn:
V-League: 2002
Đồng Tâm Long An:
V-League: 2005, 2006
Vietnamese Cup: 2005
SHB Đà Nẵng:
V-League: 2012
Vietnam:
ASEAN Football Championship: 2008

References

External links 
 Nguyen Minh Phương article from Tuanvietnam.net 

1980 births
Living people
People from Đồng Nai Province
Vietnamese footballers
Vietnam international footballers
2007 AFC Asian Cup players
V.League 1 players
SHB Da Nang FC players
Association football midfielders
Footballers at the 2002 Asian Games
Vietnamese football managers
Asian Games competitors for Vietnam